The county of Norfolk
is divided into 9 parliamentary constituencies
- 2 borough constituencies
and 7 county constituencies.

Constituencies

2010 boundary changes 
In the Fifth Review the Boundary Commission for England recommended that Norfolk's representation be increased to 9 MPs, with the creation of the constituency of Broadland, based on the District of Broadland wards which had previously comprised a majority of Mid Norfolk, as well as Drayton and Taversham, transferred back from Norwich North. It also included Fakenham and surrounding areas, transferred once again from North Norfolk. Mid Norfolk now comprised the District of Breckland wards in the previous version of the constituency with additional wards, including Watton and Attleborough, transferred from South West Norfolk. Six District of South Norfolk wards, including Wymondham, were transferred from the constituency of South Norfolk. Cringleford and Colney (but not New Costessey) were transferred back from Norwich South to South Norfolk and a small area in the south-west of the constituency of North West Norfolk was transferred to South West Norfolk.

Proposed boundary changes 
See 2023 Periodic Review of Westminster constituencies for further details.

Following the abandonment of the Sixth Periodic Review (the 2018 review), the Boundary Commission for England formally launched the 2023 Review on 5 January 2021. Initial proposals were published on 8 June 2021 and, following two periods of public consultation, revised proposals were published on 8 November 2022. Final proposals will be published by 1 July 2023.

The commission has proposed that Norfolk be combined with Suffolk as a sub-region of the Eastern Region, with the creation of the cross-county boundary constituency of Waveney Valley. Broadland would be renamed Broadland and Fakenham. The following constituencies are proposed:

Containing electoral wards from Breckland

 Mid Norfolk (part)
 South West Norfolk (part)

Containing electoral wards from Broadland

 Broadland and Fakenham (part)
 Norwich North (part)

Containing electoral wards in Great Yarmouth

 Great Yarmouth

Containing electoral wards in King's Lynn and West Norfolk

 North West Norfolk
 South West Norfolk (part)

Containing electoral wards in North Norfolk

 Broadland and Fakenham (part)
 North Norfolk

Containing electoral wards in Norwich

 Norwich North (part)
 Norwich South (part)

Containing electoral wards in South Norfolk

 Mid Norfolk (part)
 Norwich South (part)
 South Norfolk
 Waveney Valley (parts also in East Suffolk and Mid Suffolk)

Results history
Primary data source: House of Commons research briefing - General election results from 1918 to 2019

2019 
The number of votes cast for each political party who fielded candidates in constituencies comprising Norfolk in the 2019 general election were as follows:

Percentage votes 

1Includes National Liberal Party up to 1966

21950-1979 - Liberal; 1983 & 1987 - SDP-Liberal Alliance

* Included in Other

Seats 

1Includes National Liberal Party up to 1966

21950-1979 - Liberal; 1983 & 1987 - SDP-Liberal Alliance

Maps

Timeline 
Green represents former constituencies, pink represents current ones.

Historical representation by party
A cell marked → (with a different colour background to the preceding cell) indicates that the previous MP continued to sit under a new party name.

1885 to 1918

1918 to 1950

1950 to 1983

1983 to present

See also
List of parliamentary constituencies in the East of England (region)
History of parliamentary constituencies and boundaries in Norfolk

Notes

References

Norfolk
Norfolk
 
Parliamentary constituencies